This article describes the knockout stage of the 2014–15 EHF Champions League.

Qualified teams
The top four placed teams from each of the four groups advanced to the knockout stage.

Last 16
The draw was held on 24 February 2015 at 12:30 local time at Vienna.

Seedings
The seedings were published on 23 February 2015.

A team from Pot 1 faced a team from Pot 4, a Pot 2 team played against a team from Pot 3. The first legs were played on 11–15 March and the second legs on 18–22 March 2015.

Matches

|}

First leg

Second leg

Vive Tauron Kielce won 60–58 on aggregate.

MKB-MVM Veszprém won 68–54 on aggregate.

Vardar won 57–52 on aggregate.

Zagreb won 43–40 on aggregate.

Pick Szeged won 65–59 on aggregate.

Paris Saint-Germain won 46–43 on aggregate.

Barcelona won 60–33 on aggregate.

THW Kiel won 63–49 on aggregate.

Quarterfinals
The draw was held on 24 March 2015 at 11:30 local time at Vienna.

Seedings
The seedings were published on 23 March 2015.

The first legs were played on 8–12 April and the second legs on 15–19 April 2015.

Matches

|}

First leg

Second leg

Barcelona won 68–44 on aggregate.

Vive Tauron Kielce won 55–51 on aggregate.

MKB-MVM Veszprém won 58–52 on aggregate.

THW Kiel won 60–54 on aggregate.

Final four
The draw was held on 21 April 2015.

Bracket

Semifinals

Third-place game

Final

References

knockout stage